Jameh Shuran-e Sofla may refer to:
 Jameh Shuran-e Sofla, Kermanshah
 Jameh Shuran-e Sofla, Mahidasht, Kermanshah Province